Lukas Aukštikalnis (born August 19, 1995) is a Lithuanian professional basketball player.

Professional career
In the 2012-13 season, Aukšikalnis signed his first professional contract with BC Lietkabelis. He played in Lietkabelis from 2012-13 season to 2016-2017 season, when on January 26, 2017, were loaned out to BC Šiauliai. In first game against BC Dzūkija, Lukas recorded 23 points, 6 rebounds, 1 assist and made 30 EFF becoming week MVP. On August 9, 2018, Aukštikalnis signed with Levitec Huesca of the LEB Oro.

References

External links
LKL profile

1995 births
Living people
BC Lietkabelis players
Lithuanian men's basketball players
Shooting guards